Club Deportivo Olimpia Cortes is a Honduran soccer club based on Tocoa, Honduras.

The club currently plays in Liga Mayor de Futbol de Honduras.

See also
 Season 09/10 - RSSSF

Football clubs in Honduras